SS Rother was a freight vessel built for the Lancashire and Yorkshire Railway in 1914.

History

The ship was built by Clyde Shipbuilding Company Port Glasgow for the Lancashire and Yorkshire Railway and launched on 18 March 1914. She was fitted with refrigeration equipment and intended for the Goole to Hamburg services.

In 1920 three boys from Copenhagen stowed away in the hold. They were discovered shortly after departure, otherwise they would have frozen to death. Goole Magistrates ordered their return to Copenhagen.

In 1922 she transferred to the London and North Western Railway and in 1923 to the London, Midland and Scottish Railway.

She was acquired in 1948 by British Railways and remained in service until 27 September 1956 when she arrived at Dunston on Tyne for scrapping.

References

1914 ships
Steamships of the United Kingdom
Ships built on the River Clyde
Ships of the Lancashire and Yorkshire Railway
Ships of the London and North Western Railway
Ships of the London, Midland and Scottish Railway
Ships of British Rail